is an anime television series sequel to The Seven Deadly Sins: Signs of Holy War. It was announced at the "Nanatsu no Taizai FES" event in July 2017 and premiered on January 13, 2018. Takeshi Furuta and Takao Yoshioka replaced Tensai Okamura and Shōtarō Suga as director and series composer, respectively, while the other main staff members returned from the first season to reprise their roles. The series was released on October 15, 2018 on Netflix. The first opening theme song of the series titled "Howling" is a collaboration between Flow and Granrodeo, and first ending theme song is "Beautiful" performed by Anly. The second opening theme titled "Ame ga Furu kara, Niji ga Deru"(雨が降るから虹が出る) by Sky Peace and second ending theme titled "Chikai"(誓い) by Sora Amamiya.



Episode list

References

External links
Official page at Weekly Shōnen Magazine
Official anime website
 (anime) at Netflix
Official video game website

2018 Japanese television seasons
2
Fiction about purgatory